With Love is an EP released by Canadian jazz performer Michael Bublé. It was released on February 14, 2006 as part of a Valentine's Day promotion, and was exclusively sold in Hallmark Gold Crown stores, under the licensee Hallmark Cards, under license from 143 and Reprise. The album compiles tracks previously released on Michael Bublé (2003), Come Fly with Me (2004), and It's Time (2005), along with two previously unreleased tracks.

Track listing

Release history

References

Michael Bublé albums
2006 EPs
143 Records EPs
Reprise Records EPs